Lennart Augustsson is a Swedish computer scientist. He was previously a lecturer at the Computing Science Department at Chalmers University of Technology. His research field is functional programming and implementations of functional languages.

Augustsson has worked for Carlstedt Research and Technology, Sandburst, Credit Suisse, Standard Chartered Bank, Facebook, X Development, Google and is currently employed by Epic Games.

Augustsson is the author of:
 The Cayenne programming language.
 The HBC Haskell compiler.
 Several hardware device drivers for NetBSD.
 The front end of the pH compiler (parallel Haskell) from MIT.
 The initial version of the Bluespec compiler.
He was also a co-developer, with Thomas Johnsson, of Lazy ML, a functional programming language developed in the early 1980s, prior to Miranda and Haskell. LML is a strongly typed, statically scoped implementation of ML, with lazy evaluation. The key innovation of LML was to demonstrate how to compile a lazy functional language. Until then, lazy languages had been implemented via interpreted graph reduction. LML compiled to G-machine code.

Augustsson was intimately involved in early LPMud development, both in the LPMUD driver and the CD mudlib. His MUD community pseudonym is Marvin.

Augustsson has written three winning entries in the International Obfuscated C Code Contest:
 1985: Most obscure program (1985/august.c)
 1986: Best complex task done in a complex way (1986/august.c)
 1996: Best of Show (1996/august.c)

References

External links

 Lennart Augustsson's blog
 The HBC compiler

Swedish computer scientists
Swedish computer programmers
Programming language researchers
MUD developers
Year of birth missing (living people)
Living people